The 2008 FIFA World Player of the Year awards took place on 12 January 2009 at the Zurich Opera House, Zürich, Switzerland, with Cristiano Ronaldo of Manchester United and Portugal taking the men's award, and Marta of Umeå IK and Brazil taking the women's award for the third year in a row. 

Other awards included the FIFA Development Award, which went to the Palestinian Football Federation for keeping its organisation and national team active; Federation President Jibril Al Rajoub, captain of the men's team Ahmad Kashkash, and women's team captain Honey Thaljiyeh were presented with the award. The Palestinian FA carried out a major refurbishment of the Al-Husseini Stadium, meaning that it met the standards to host an international match, becoming the first stadium in Palestinian territories to achieve this honour. Women's football received the FIFA Presidential Award, with the US team presented with the award (for their achievements), and player Heather O'Reilly collecting it. The FIFA Fair Play Award went to the representatives of the Turkish and Armenian national teams. Prior to a European World Cup qualifying match, the Presidents of the two FAs, Mahmut Özgener (Turkey) and Ruben Hayrapetyan (Armenia) shook hands, which was significant as the countries shared a long history of hostility towards each other.

Shortlists of 23 men and 10 women were announced on 29 October 2008, before being reduced to five men and five women by 12 December 2008. The male nominees were Kaká, Lionel Messi, Cristiano Ronaldo, Fernando Torres and Xavi, and the female nominees were Nadine Angerer, Cristiane, Marta, Birgit Prinz and Kelly Smith.

Results

Men

Women

References

FIFA World Player of the Year
FIFA World Player of the Year
Women's association football trophies and awards
2008 in women's association football